Tricholoma odorum is a mushroom of the agaric genus Tricholoma. It was formally described in 1898 by American mycologist Charles Horton Peck. It is considered inedible.

See also
List of North American Tricholoma

References

External links
 

Fungi described in 1898
Fungi of North America
odorum
Taxa named by Charles Horton Peck